Wyatt Eure "Roxy" Snipes (October 28, 1896 – May 1, 1941) was a professional baseball outfielder. He appeared in one game for the 1923 Chicago White Sox of Major League Baseball (MLB).

Biography

Snipes played in the minor leagues for three seasons—1923, 1925, and 1926—for teams in the Carolinas and Florida. His one major league appearance came for the Chicago White Sox on July 15, 1923. In a home game against the Philadelphia Athletics, he was hitless in one at bat, appearing as a pinch hitter for pitcher Red Faber in the eighth inning.

Snipes was born in Marion, South Carolina. He attended the University of South Carolina, where he played college baseball and college football. He served in the United States Navy during World War I, then returned to college and graduated with a law degree in 1924. Snipes worked as attorney and served in the South Carolina Senate representing Marion County. He died of pneumonia in Fayetteville, North Carolina, at the age of 44 in 1941.

References

External links

Chicago White Sox players
Greenville Spinners players
Columbia Comers players
Gastonia Comers players
St. Augustine Saints players
Jacksonville Tars players
Baseball players from South Carolina
1896 births
1941 deaths
People from Marion, South Carolina
University of South Carolina alumni
United States Navy personnel of World War I
Deaths from pneumonia in North Carolina